Katsuhiko Miyaji (宮地 克彦, born August 28, 1971) is a former Nippon Professional Baseball outfielder.

External links

1971 births
Living people
Baseball people from Osaka Prefecture
Japanese baseball players
Nippon Professional Baseball outfielders
Seibu Lions players
Fukuoka Daiei Hawks players
Fukuoka SoftBank Hawks players
Japanese baseball coaches
Nippon Professional Baseball coaches
People from Daitō, Osaka